Il Gaucho (internationally released as The Gaucho) is a  1964 Italian comedy film directed by Dino Risi. It was co-produced by Clemente Lococo, an Argentinian production company, and in Argentina it was released as Un italiano en la Argentina. For his role in this film Nino Manfredi won a Grolla d'oro for best actor.

Cast 
Vittorio Gassman as Marco Ravicchio
Amedeo Nazzari as Ingegnere Marucchelli
Nelly Panizza as Ines Marucchelli
Jorgelina Aranda: Italia Marucchelli
Umberto D'Orsi as Gianni Pertini
Maria Grazia Buccella as Mara
Annie Gorassini as Lorella
Guido Gorgatti as Giulio
Norberto Sánchez Calleja as Cecilio
Maria Fiore as Maria
Francesco Mulè as Fiorini
Nora Cárpena as Lida
Nino Manfredi as Stefano
Silvana Pampanini as Luciana
Nando Angelini as Aldo
Nelly Tesolín as Prostitute
Aldo Vianello
Vicky Astori
Amparito Castro
Mario Mario
José Del Vecchio
Rafael Diserio
Carmen Pericolo

References

External links

1964 films
Commedia all'italiana
Films directed by Dino Risi
Films about immigration
Films set in Buenos Aires
Films shot in Buenos Aires
Self-reflexive films
Films with screenplays by Ruggero Maccari
1964 comedy films
1960s Italian films